Robert Lee "Pops" Popwell (December 29, 1950 – November 27, 2017) was an American jazz-funk bass guitarist and percussionist.

Career
Known as "Pops", he played with The Young Rascals, The Crusaders and the Macon Rhythm Section. The Young Rascals were inducted into the Rock and Roll Hall of Fame May 6, 1997. They were inducted into the Vocal Group Hall of Fame in 2005. He has played on albums by Aretha Franklin, George Benson, Ron Wood, Al Jarreau, Bobby Womack, Terry Bradds, Larry Carlton, Joe Sample, Smokey Robinson, Bette Midler, Gregg Allman, Bob Dylan, B. B. King, Les Dudek and Randy Crawford, among others. Most notably he played percussion on Aretha Franklin's Rock Steady.

He has also toured with Bette Midler and Olivia Newton-John. Popwell appeared in the movie Hard to Hold with Rick Springfield. Featured in the 1982 Olivia Newton-John, Live concert video. Co-writer of "Boy Meets World" with Rap star Erick Sermon. Also wrote "Feelin Funky" on The Crusaders album Those Southern Knights.

Popwell died in Lebanon, Tennessee, at the age of 66. He was survived by his wife and three children.

Discography 
1969: I'm a Loser - Doris Duke
1970: Johnny Jenkins - Johnny Jenkins
1970: Livingston Taylor - Livingston Taylor
1971: Liv - Livingston Taylor
1972: The Island Of Real − The Rascals
1972: Young, Gifted and Black - Aretha Franklin
1973: In Between Tears - Irma Thomas
1974: Southern Comfort - The Crusaders
1976: Those Southern Knights - The Crusaders
1976: Everything Must Change - Randy Crawford
1977: Eddie Money - Eddie Money
1977: Free As the Wind - The Crusaders
1977: Lisa Dal Bello - Lisa Dal Bello
1978: Images - The Crusaders
1978: Midnight Believer - B.B. King
1978: Letta - Letta Mbulu
1979: Gimme Some Neck - Ron Wood
1979: Praying Spirit - Gloster Williams and Master Control
1979: Livin' Inside Your Love - George Benson
1980: Strikes Twice - Larry Carlton
1981: Love Life - Brenda Russell
1982: Baked potato Superlive! - The Greg Mathieson Project
1983: No Frills - Bette Midler
1990: Collection - Larry Carlton
2006: Sumner Sessions - Terry Bradds
2007: Master Hands - Terry Bradds
2009: Touch of Spice - Terry Bradds and Nioshi Jackson

References

External links

Robert Popwell at the Macon Rhythm Section

1950 births
2017 deaths
American rock bass guitarists
American jazz bass guitarists
American funk bass guitarists
American male bass guitarists
American rhythm and blues bass guitarists
African-American jazz musicians
The Rascals members
20th-century American bass guitarists
20th-century African-American musicians
American male jazz musicians
The Crusaders members
People from Daytona Beach, Florida